Diomea rotundata is a moth of the family Noctuidae first described by Francis Walker in 1857. It is found in Sri Lanka, the Indian subregion, Taiwan, Sumatra, Borneo, the Philippines and Sumba.

Description
Forewings steely greyish black, and marked with black, including prominent discal spots. A larger white mark on the forewing costa can be seen sometimes. There is an irregular black submarginal line which is expanded into blocks sub-dorsally and at one third from the costa, with a smaller block on the costa. Hindwing with a longitudinal rectangle. The caterpillar is a fungus feeder. It is dirty white with indistinct pink marbling. A pink spot is found dorsally at the rear of each segment. The head lacks setae, but with glossy tubercles. Pupation begins on a tree or the fungus in a tight-fitting cocoon which is semi-ovoid in shape.

References

External links
Eight new records of the family Erebidae (Lepidoptera: Noctuoidea) from India
Two new species of Diomeu Walker (Lepidoptera, Noctuidae) from Japan, Taiwan and Myanmar

Moths of Asia
Moths described in 1857